Tarraghter, also recorded as Erraghter and Farraghter, is an ancient Irish district in what is now north-eastern County Tyrone, Northern Ireland. Tarraghter along with Melanagh were once part of the barony of Loughinsholin until the Plantation of Ulster, which saw them merged with the barony of Mountjoy (modern-day barony of Dungannon Upper).

The southern boundary of Tarraghter is the Ballinderry River running east, encompassing the greater parts of the parishes of Derryloran, Kildress, and Lissan that lie north of the river. It however excluded the termon land of Melanagh, which lie along the Lissan River.

Eytmology
The townland of Oritor in Kildress civil parish, is cited as maintaining the original Irish name of the territory - Arachtra. Indeed, amongst the previous recorded forms of Oritor townland are listed: Arrater (1614, 1620, 1655); Erraghter (1616, 1619, 1621); and Tarraghter (1614, 1619, 1621). It is also recorded in 1645 in Irish as Fharachtra.

References

Barony of Loughinsholin
Barony of Dungannon Upper
History of County Londonderry